Jeffersonite is a dark green pyroxene mineral, a manganese zinc enriched variety of augite, chemical formula , sometimes compared to aegirine. Jeffersonite is not a recognized mineral name.

It is reported from the Sterling Hill Mine, Franklin, New Jersey, in South Australia and Sweden.

External links
Mindat
Abandoned Mines of New Jersey

Calcium minerals
Manganese(II) minerals
Iron(II) minerals
Zinc minerals
Pyroxene group
Minerals described in 1822